Asthena lassa is a moth in the family Geometridae. It is found in Myanmar.

References

Moths described in 1926
Asthena
Moths of Asia